is a Japanese character designer for various games and anime series such as Saber Marionette J, VS Knight Ramune & 40 Fire, Cyber Team in Akihabara and Battle Arena Toshinden. He also did the art for Sword of the Dark Ones. His real name is unknown; his title name is rather a pen name, majorly derived from animator Tsukasa Dokite.

In 2003, he attended Otakon as a guest.

Biography
Around the age of nine and attending fourth grade, Tsukasa was introduced to anime with the initial series of Mobile Suit Gundam, and was further inspired to go into anime upon the release of Mobile Suit Z Gundam in his second year of middle school. After going to his first Comiket, by the time of 1985, Tsukasa began his career as a manga artist through dojinshi circles, particularly through junior high and high school fanzine anthologies under the initial pseudonym . His current pseudonym is derived from the pronunciations of the individual kanji that make up the compound for the Japanese word for "sushi." His talents and connections with editors during his high school career allowed him to land work with illustrations for commercial design and general staff work for anime studios and manga circles; by the age of twenty, he became an apprentice of Kenichi Sonoda. After his apprenticeship in 1994, his friend Masami Obari, whose then current projects were that of the Fatal Fury OVA movies, let him work on staff as the off action wardrobe and character designer for Fatal Fury: The Motion Picture.

Inspiration and Style
His art style is largely influenced particularly from series Mobile Suit Gundam and Megazone 23, and fellow superiors in the industry, such as Tsukasa Dokite, Masamune Shirow, Masakazu Katsura, Kenichi Sonoda, and Masami Obari. Tsukasa's 1990s anime style works are defined as wild, making the use of vivid colors and soft but stark contrasting shades, and somewhat exaggerated features of human anatomy along with realistic features, including that of puffed up cheeks, which he helped launch into popularity as they were in style at the time for defining cute characters and aesthetics. Into the current day, his style is defined by more subdued but more flowing coloring and an emphasis on darker and thicker lining work.

Personal life
Outside of work in the anime industry, Tsukasa is a lifelong fan of Gundam and video games, particularly of King of Fighters and Pokémon. He occasionally does doujinshi in his spare time, sometimes of adult oriented parodies, under different pseudonyms, such as Noriharu or Gym Leader.

Works

Manga
Go! Go! Bokurano V Gundam!!
Mechanical Man Blues (overseas exclusive manga series, 1994, unfinished)
Cyber Team in Akihabara pattern Pi!
Ragnarok/Sword of the Dark Ones
Mobile Suit Gundam Z: The Day After Tomorrow: Kai's Reports
Mobile Suit Gundam Z: Kai's Memories

Anime
Fatal Fury: The Motion Picture
Battle Arena Toshinden
VS Knight Ramune & 40 Fire'''Saber Marionette JGodannarDante's InfernoSuper Robot Wars OG: The InspectorMobile Suit Gundam: THE ORIGINOfficial endorsed fan compilations

Video gamesBattle Arena Toshinden- Official IllustratorBattle Arena Toshinden Remix (Toshinden S)Battle Arena Toshinden 2Battle Arena Toshinden URABattle Arena Toshinden 3NitoushindenPuzzle Arena ToshindenToshinden Card QuestToshinden Next (cancelled installment)Battle Arena Toshinden 4Saber Marionette J· Battle SabersGalaxy Fräulein Yuna 3: Lightning AngelThousand ArmsCyber Team in Akihabara Pata Pies!No More Heroes: Heroes' ParadiseMusicGundam Song Covers (2019)Gundam Song Covers 2'' (2020)

References

External links
 
 Tsukasa Kotobuki anime at Media Arts Database 
Interview with a Tsukasa Kotobuki

Anime character designers
Living people
Manga artists from Tokyo
1970 births